"Wear My Ring Around Your Neck" is a song written by Bert Carroll and Russell Moody, performed by Elvis Presley, which was released in 1958. It was particularly notable for breaking a string of ten consecutive number 1 hits for Presley achieved in just two years. It was Presley's 6th number-one hit in the American R&B Charts, and peaked at number 2 on the American Pop Charts.

Personnel
 Elvis Presley – lead vocals, rhythm guitar, guitar percussion, piano
 Scotty Moore – lead guitar
 Bill Black — bass guitar
 D. J. Fontana – drums
 Dudley Brooks – piano
 The Jordanaires – backing vocals

Chart performance

Ricky Van Shelton version
American country music singer Ricky Van Shelton covered the song for the soundtrack of the 1992 movie Honeymoon in Vegas. Shelton's version, also included on his album Greatest Hits Plus, where it was released to as the album's first single and it peaked at number 26 on the Billboard Hot Country Singles & Tracks chart.

Chart performance

References

1958 singles
Elvis Presley songs
1992 singles
Ricky Van Shelton songs
Hep Stars songs
Music videos directed by Deaton-Flanigen Productions
Song recordings produced by Stephen H. Sholes
RCA Victor singles
Epic Records singles
1958 songs